Tom Gardner (born April 16, 1968) is an American entrepreneur. He is one of the three founders of The Motley Fool. He is currently the company's CEO.

Gardner is the author of The Motley Fool Hidden Gems newsletter, which aims to find the most promising small public companies for investment, and The Motley Fool Stock Advisor newsletter, in which he competes with his brother, David.

Gardner attended Brown University, graduating in 1990 with a B.A. with honors in English and Creative Writing. He later pursued two master's degrees at the University of Montana but left the programs to return to the D.C. area as The Motley Fool was gaining momentum. He received an honorary PhD in Humane Letters from Strayer University in 2000.

In 1993, he and his older brother, David Gardner, started The Motley Fool as a vehicle for teaching people about saving and investment. The two had learned how to invest from their father. The website serves more than 5 million people around the world each month.

Gardner has testified before the United States Congress, calling for greater transparency to the dealings on Wall Street.

The Gardner brothers have co-authored several books, including The Motley Fool Investment Guide, You Have More Than You Think, Rule Breakers, Rule Makers, and The Motley Fool Investment Guide for Teens.

References

External links
 The Motley Fool official website

1968 births
Brown University alumni
Living people
20th-century American businesspeople
American chief executives